This article lists metropolitan or district level planning agencies in India grouped by their home state or union territory. Planning agencies are different from Municipal Authorities in their mandate and functions. They are responsible for infrastructure development,  slum rehabilitation, preparation and implementation of master plans, eco-friendly schemes, transportation etc. Note that a metropolitan area may have more than one such agency.

Andhra Pradesh 
Urban Development Authorities (UDAs) include

 Visakhapatnam
 Visakhapatnam Metropolitan Region Development Authority (VMRDA)

 Vijayawada
 Amaravati Metropolitan Region Development Authority

 Tirupati
 Tirupati Urban Development Authority (TUDA)

 Kurnool
 Kurnool Urban Development Authority (KUDA)

Machilipatnam
Machilipatnam Urban Development Authority (MUDA)

Anantapur–Hindupur
Anantapuramu–Hindupur Urban Development Authority (AHUDA)

Bobbili
Bobbili Urban Development Authority (BUDA)

Chittoor
Chittoor Urban Development Authority (CHUDA)

Eluru
Eluru Urban Development Authority (EUDA)
Rajahmundry–Kakinada
Godavari Urban Development Authority (GUDA)
Kadapa
Annamayya Urban Development Authority (AUDA)

Nellore
Nellore Urban Development Authority (NUDA)

Ongole
Ongole Urban Development Authority (OUDA)

Palamaner–Kuppam–Madanapalle
Palamaner Kuppam Madanapalle Urban Development Authority (PKMUDA)

Puttaparthi
Puttaparthi Urban Development Authority (PUDA)

Srikakulam
Srikakulam Urban Development Authority (SUDA)

Gujarat 
There are 16 constituted Urban/Area Development Authorities and 113 designated Area Development Authorities available in Gujarat.

Karnataka 

 Bangalore
• Bangalore Development Authority
 Bangalore Metropolitan Region Development Authority (BMRDA)
 Hubli-Dharwad
 Hubballi-Dharwad Urban Development Authority
 Mysore
 Mysore Urban Development Authority
 Mangalore
 Mangalore Urban Development Authority

Maharashtra 
 Mumbai & Navi Mumbai
 Mumbai Metropolitan Region Development Authority  (MMRDA)
 City and Industrial Development Corporation  (CIDCO)

 Nagpur
NMRDA - Nagpur Metropolitan Region Development Authority 
Nagpur Improvement Trust 
MIHAN - Multi-modal International Cargo Hub and Airport at Nagpur
 Pune
 Pune Metropolitan Region Development Authority  (PMRDA)
Nashik
 Nashik Metropolitan region development Authority (NMRDA)

Tamil Nadu 
 Chennai Metropolitan Development AuthorityOverseas the districts of Chennai, Kanchipuram, Thiruvallur and chengalpattu
Coimbatore city serves in coimbatore Metropolitan area and others
Salem city serves Salem metropolitan area and Erode , Tiruppur district

Telangana 
Urban Development Authorities in Telangana include

 Hyderabad
 Hyderabad Metropolitan Development Authority (HMDA)
 Warangal
Kakatiya Urban Development Authority (KUDA)
 Karimnagar
 Satavahana Urban Development Authority (SUDA)
 Nizamabad
 Nizamabad Urban Development Authority (NUDA)
Khammam
 Stambadri Urban Development Authority (SUDA)
Siddipet
 Siddipet Urban Development Authority (SUDA)

Uttar Pradesh 

 Kanpur Development Authority (KDA)

Rajasthan

 Jaipur Development Authority JDA
 Jodhpur Development Authority JoDA in official Terms and JDA Unofficially 
 Kota Development Authority KDA

References 

Local government in India
Economic planning in India
India government-related lists